The Lurkers are a British punk rock band from Uxbridge, West London. They are notable for being the first group ever on Beggars Banquet Records for whom they released two albums, the first of which charted in the UK Albums Chart, while five singles also charted in the UK Singles Chart.

Career
The Lurkers formed late in 1976, the original line-up consisting in Pete Stride on guitar, Pete "Manic Esso" Haynes on drums, Pete "Plug" Edwards on vocals and Nigel Moore on bass. Edwards was replaced by Howard Wall after a few rehearsals, with him becoming the band's road manager. Stride was the band's main songwriter. The band played their first gig at Uxbridge Technical College in December supporting Screaming Lord Sutch to an audience of 10. The band were one of the early punk bands that played live in the first few months of the Roxy Club in London. Moore was swiftly replaced by Arturo Bassick. They supported The Jam in February 1977, Eater in March, and Slaughter & The Dogs in April.

The Lurkers recorded four sessions at Maida Vale Studios for John Peel at BBC Radio 1, between 1977 and 1979. Their debut single "Shadow", the first release on Beggars Banquet Records, was voted by John Peel's listeners as twelfth best track of the year in 1977's Festive Fifty. with "Love Story", the B-side, at number 31. Bassick left the band after this first single, and was replaced by former Saints member Kym Bradshaw, who left before the recording of the third single, 1978's "Ain't Got a Clue"/"Ooh, Ooh I Love You" which saw the return of Moore to the band. That single was their biggest hit, reaching No. 45 on the UK Singles Chart.

The following month, the band’s debut album, Fulham Fallout, reached No. 57 on the UK Albums Chart. One reviewer described it as "by far their best with production that really makes the guitar kick. It's sloppy and amateurish, but that's what makes it so great." "Be My Prisoner", a  song from the album, also appeared on Streets, a 1977 compilation album of early UK punk bands from a variety of independent record labels.

In January 1979, The Lurkers’ fifth single, "Just Thirteen", was released, and in 2001 it was included in Mojo magazine’s list of the best punk rock singles of all time. A month after the release of this single, The Lurkers' track "I'm on Heat" appeared, alongside songs by more famous bands like The Jam and The Stranglers, on the punk compilation 20 of Another Kind (Polydor, POLS 1006). The album reached number 45 in the UK chart. Another of the band's tracks, "Out in the Dark", appeared on the follow-up 20 of Another Kind Volume 2.

The band’s second album was not as well received, critically or commercially, as their debut, and the band split for a few years. Pete Stride collaborated with ‘Honest’ John Plain (of English punk band the Boys) and released an album in January 1980. In 1982, Stride re-formed the Lurkers. They signed for Stoke-on-Trent-based label Clay Records, for whom they released four singles and one album. The band broke up again in 1984.

In the years since, they have reunited with various members numerous times, and continue to record and perform around the world to this day, although in reality this is just Arturo and some of his friends. Their legacy, however, is primarily based on their late 1970s output.  "Shadow", "Ain't Got a Clue", and "Just Thirteen" in particular are cited by punk cognoscenti as classic examples of the style, and still show up from time to time on genre overview compilations. The current line-up is: Bassick (bass and vocals) who also plays for 999, Dave Kemp (guitar) and Stuart Meadows (drums). In January 2009 the band supported punk legends the Buzzcocks on fourteen dates of their UK tour. All Lurkers studio albums released between 1988 and 2008 were made by Arturo Bassick's incarnation of the band.

In the 2010s, Esso, Stride and Moore collaborated again, initially under the name of The Lurkers:God's Lonely Men before later reverting to just The Lurkers. They released a CD in 2012 entitled Chemical Landslide which contained tracks considered a lot heavier than anything they had previously recorded under the Lurkers name. In 2016 they released a further album The Future's Calling and collaborated on follow-up material with The Featherz' lead singer Danie Cox. The fruit of the collaboration with Cox - the single A Side High Velocity - was released on 24 November 2017 as a limited edition of 500 copies on 7 inch pink vinyl. and the band recorded further material with Cox in December 2017.  By February 2018 Cox, now known as Danie Centric, was enlisted as long term vocalist for Esso, Stride and Moore's version of the band (while also continuing with The Featherz, with whom, during their set at the 2018 Rebellion Festival, she previewed live a new Lurkers song, "This Is Your Revolution.")  The band's second single with Centric - "Electrical Guitar"/"That Was Julia" was released in January 2019 and topped the UK Vinyl Singles chart.  Parent album Sex Crazy was released in October 2020. 

In May 2021, Arturo Bassick disbanded his version of The Lurkers after 34 years, deciding to concentrate his live performances on his work with the band 999. They had played their final gigs in March 2020 prior to the Covid-19 pandemic. This left the alternate version of the band as the sole active incarnation.

Lineups

Reviews
 ‘Bouncy pub-punk that owed far more to a band like Eddie and the Hot Rods than to The Clash’.
 ‘Unabashedly as indebted to The Ramones as the Pistols but boasting a mock-cockney swagger which was utterly unique’.
 ‘Relentless, uncompromising barrage of 100 mph raw punk rock, taking its lead from the Ramones but replacing the bubblegum factor with an aggressive edge more akin to Motörhead’.
 'No pretensions, no hype, no frills and were nothing less than pure rock'n'roll. This is a band who deserve so much more respect than they get'.
 ‘London’s answer to the Ramones’.
 ‘When the band is at its best (notably in their singles "Ain't Got a Clue," "I Don't Need to Tell Her," and "Shadow..."), the album is an astonishing accomplishment, a blur of high octane riffs and unforgettable hooks tumbling over one another without a care for manners or niceties’.
 ‘The Lurkers were not loved by the Punk Rock cognoscenti - that didn’t stop juvenile urchins like me latching on to their Ramones-esque brevity & celebrating for all it was worth. Their debut 7, Shadow (Beg 1) was one of the greatest Punk Rock sides in the relatively short history of the genre’.
 ‘Their records are very simple, basic, underproduced stuff that makes the Ramones sound like Queen. But they had a knack for really catchy, singalong choruses and they've got this amateurish charm that you just have to fall for eventually. I now rank these guys as among the greats’.

Discography

Albums

Studio albums
Fulham Fallout (June 1978: Beggars Banquet, BEGA 2) # 57 UK Albums Chart
God's Lonely Men (April 1979: Beggars Banquet, BEGA 8)
This Dirty Town (July 1983: Clay Records, CLAY 104)
Wild Times Again (Feb. 1988: Weser) released by Arturo Bassick's incarnation of The Lurkers
King of the Mountain (June 1989: Link) released by Arturo Bassick's incarnation of The Lurkers
Powerjive (October 1990: Released Emotions) released by Arturo Bassick's incarnation of The Lurkers
Non-Stop Nitropop (November 1994: Weser) released by Arturo Bassick's incarnation of The Lurkers
Ripped 'N' Torn (1995: Step 1) released by Arturo Bassick's incarnation of The Lurkers
26 Years (2003: Captain Oi! Ahoy 229) released by Arturo Bassick's incarnation of The Lurkers
Fried Brains (2008: Captain Oi! Ahoy 301) released by Arturo Bassick's incarnation of The Lurkers
Chemical Landslide (2012 Unlatched Records)
The Future's Calling (2016: Unlatched Records UL002)
Sex Crazy (2020 Damaged Goods DAMGOOD541)

Compilation albums
Last Will and Testament - Greatest Hits (November 1980)
Totally Lurkered (Dojo, December 1992) released by Arturo Bassick's incarnation of The Lurkers
The Beggars Banquet Punk Singles (Anagram, May 1997)
Take Me Back to Babylon (Receiver, December 1997)

Live albums
Live and Loud (Link, November 1989) released by Arturo Bassick's incarnation of The Lurkers
Live in Berlin (Released Emotions, June 1992) released by Arturo Bassick's incarnation of The Lurkers
 Freakshow Live (Kotumba Records 2004) released by Arturo Bassick's incarnation of The Lurkers

Compilation appearances (selective)
Listing of those various artist compilation albums mentioned in the text of the main article:
"Be My Prisoner" featured on the Streets compilation album (End of 1977: Beggars Banquet BEGA1)
"I'm on Heat" featured on the 20 of Another Kind compilation album (1979: Polydor Records POLX-1) UK No. 45 UK Albums Chart

Singles
"Shadow" / "Love Story" (July 1977: Beggars Banquet, BEG 1)
"Freak Show" / "Mass Media Believer" (October 1977: Beggars Banquet, BEG 2)
"Ain't Got a Clue" / "Ooh Ooh I Love You" (May 1978: Beggars Banquet, BEG 6) # 45 UK Singles Chart
"I Don't Need to Tell Her" / "Pills" (July 1978: Beggars Banquet, BEG 9) # 49
"Just Thirteen" / "Countdown" (January 1979: Beggars Banquet, BEG 14) # 66
Out in the Dark EP: "Cyanide" / "Suzie Is a Floozie" / "Cyanide" (pub version) (May 1979: Beggars Banquet, BEG 19) # 72
"New Guitar in Town" / "Pick Me Up" / "Little Ol' Wine Drinker Me" (November 1979: Beggars Banquet, BEG 28) # 72
"Shadow" / "Love Story" / "Freak Show" / "Mass Media Believer" (1979: Beggars Banquet, BACK 1) double-7" pack
"I Don't Need to Tell Her" / "Pills" / "Just Thirteen" / "Countdown" (1979: Beggars Banquet, BACK 3) double-7" pack
"This Dirty Town" / "Wolf at the Door" (June 1982: Clay, CLAY 12)
"Drag You Out" / "Heroin (It's All Over)" (November 1982: Clay, CLAY 17)
"Frankenstein Again" / "One Man's Meat..." (February 1983: Clay)
Final Vinyl EP: "Let's Dance Now (No Time to Be Strangers)" / "Midnight Hour" / "By the Heart" / "Frankenstein Again" (March 1984: Clay)
"Let's Dance Now" / "Midnight Hour" (May 1984: Clay, CLAY 32)
"Go Ahead Punk" / "Lucky John" (Empty Records, 1999)
"High Velocity" (featuring Danie Cox) /"White Noise and Feedback"/"One Butterfly" (November 2017 Human Punk / Damaged Goods)
"Electrical Guitar" / "That Was Julia" (both tracks featuring Danie Centric) (January 2019 Human Punk / Damaged Goods) - UK Vinyl Singles chart #1
"Fits You Like a Glove"/ "When You Are Borderline" (September 2020, Damaged Goods)
"The Boys In The Corner" / "We Close The Door" (April 2021, Damaged Goods)

See also
 List of British punk bands
 List of musicians in the first wave of punk music
 List of Peel sessions

References

External links
 
 The Lurkers on www.punk77.co.uk
 The Lurkers on Punkmodpop

English punk rock groups
English new wave musical groups
Musical groups from London
Musical groups established in 1976
1976 establishments in the United Kingdom